Pythium ultimum is a plant pathogen.  It causes the damping off and root rot diseases of hundreds of diverse plant hosts including corn, soybean, potato, wheat, fir, and many ornamental species.  P. ultimum belongs to the peronosporalean lineage of oomycetes, along with other important plant pathogens such as Phytophthora spp. and many genera of downy mildews.  P. ultimum is a frequent inhabitant of fields, freshwater ponds, and decomposing vegetation in most areas of the world.  Contributing to the widespread distribution and persistence of P. ultimum is its ability to grow saprotrophically in soil and plant residue.  This trait is also exhibited by most Pythium spp. but not by the related Phytophthora spp., which can only colonize living plant hosts.

Pathology and disease management
Infections of seeds and roots are initiated by both the mycelia and spores of P. ultimum.  Two spore types are made, depending on the strain.  P. ultimum is a species complex that includes P. u. var. ultimum and P. u. var. sporangiiferum.  The major distinguishing feature is that sporangia and zoospores (swimming spores) are produced only rarely by P. u. var. ultimum.  Both species make oospores, which are thick-walled structures produced by sexual recombination.  Both varieties are self-fertile (homothallic), which means that a single strain can mate with itself.  In addition to oospores, P. u. var. ultimum also makes hyphal swellings which germinate in a manner resembling sporangia to form plant-infecting hyphae.  One important ecological difference between the different types of spores is that sporangia and zoospores are short-lived, while the thick-walled oospores can persist for years within soil, surviving even winter freezes. Mycelia and oospores in soil can infect seeds or roots.  This leads to wilting, reduced yield, and ultimately plant death.  Common signs of a Pythium infection include stunting of the plants, brown coloration of root-tips, and wilting of the plant during the warm part of the day.  Management of disease is challenging but focuses on sanitation, fungicides, and biological control.  Fungicides include mefenoxam, thiadiazole, etridiazole, propamocarb, dimethomorph, and phosphonates.  Biological control agents include the bacteria Bacillus subtilis, Streptomyces griseoviridis, and the fungi Candida oleophila, Gliocladium catenulatum, Trichoderma harzianum, and Trichoderma virens.

Effective resistance in the plant host is generally not available.  Sanitation is very important since the pathogen can be easily introduced into pasteurized soil or even soil-free potting mixes on dirty tools or pots. Especially in greenhouses, fungus gnats may also help move the pathogen from place to place. A recent study of greenhouses in Michigan revealed that the same pathogen populations were responsible for the root rot of all greenhouse ornamental plants over a two-year period. These results stress the importance of sanitation and encourage greenhouse growers to improve their scouting of all incoming plant material to prevent additional root rot.

Genetics
The genomes of both P. u. var. ultimum and P. u. var. sporangiiferum have been sequenced.  Analysis of the genomes suggest that the two species encode 15,290 and 14,086 proteins, respectively.

Samples of Pythium sp isolates from soils in Japan were analyzed phylogenetically; the phylogenetic trees were divided into five monophyletic clades, proposed as new genera (Pythium, Elongisporangium, Ovatisporangium, Globisporangium, and Pilasporangium). Under this new phylogeny, Pythium ultimum would be renamed to Globisporangium ultimum.

References

External links
 Pythium Genome Database
 Index Fungorum
 USDA ARS Fungal Database
 NCBI Taxonomy Browser

Water mould plant pathogens and diseases
ultimum
Soybean diseases